Amesorhaga is a genus of flies in the family Dolichopodidae. All species in the genus are from the Oriental realm.

Species
The genus contains seven species, all originally from Mesorhaga:
Amesorhaga angulata (Parent, 1935) – West Malaysia
Amesorhaga argentifacies (Parent, 1941) – Thailand, West Malaysia
Amesorhaga breviappendiculata (De Meijere, 1916) – Java
Amesorhaga femorata (De Meijere, 1916) – Java
Amesorhaga malayensis (Parent, 1935) – West Malaysia
Amesorhaga mellavana (Hollis, 1964) – Sri Lanka
Amesorhaga pseudolata (Hollis, 1964) – Sri Lanka

Four further species of Amesorhaga, all extinct, were described from Baltic amber by Negrobov and Selivanova in 2003: A. bickeli, A. longicerca, A. quadrispinosa and A. vladimiri. These have since been moved to the extinct genus Wheelerenomyia by Igor Grichanov in 2008.

References 

Dolichopodidae genera
Sciapodinae
Diptera of Asia